General elections were held in South Africa on 6 September 1989, the last under apartheid. Snap elections had been called early (no election was required until 1992) by the recently elected head of the National Party (NP), F. W. de Klerk, who was in the process of replacing P. W. Botha as the country's president, and his expected program of reform to include further retreat from the policy of apartheid. The creation of the Conservative Party had realigned the NP as a moderate party, now almost certain to initiate negotiations with the black opposition, with liberal opposition (the PFP) openly seeking a new constitutional settlement on liberal democratic and federalist principles.

Although the National Party won a comfortable majority of seats (94 of 166) in the House of Assembly, the governing party suffered a setback and received only 48% of the popular vote, the first elections since 1961 in which the NP failed to win a majority of the vote. However, the first-past-the-post system, and a severely fractured opposition as well as the twelve appointed and indirectly elected members entrenched the NP's majority, allowing it to comfortably remain in power. 

The Conservative Party (CP), which opposed any form of power-sharing with other races, failed to accomplish a breakthrough beyond its conservative Afrikaner backing as some had expected, but remained the official opposition with 39 seats. By some estimates, the party had received the backing of a slim majority of Afrikaners particularly in the Orange Free State, once the NP's heartland, but with very limited support among English-speaking voters. 

Before the elections, the liberal Progressive Federal Party (PFP) had dissolved itself and regrouped as the Democratic Party (DP), winning 33 seats, six seats short of retaking its position as the official opposition. In terms of vote share, it fell a quarter million votes behind the CP, but was favoured by its stronghold in the Cape Province and Natal.

House of Assembly (white)
The White Chamber of Parliament had 178 members, 166 of whom were directly elected (including a seat from Walvis Bay annexed from South West Africa, which was added in 1981) with 8 members indirectly elected by the directly elected members on the basis of proportional representation and four nominated by the State President (one from each province).

The results of the election were interpreted by the government (based on support for the NP and the DP together) as a mandate from the white electorate to reform the apartheid system and seek a compromise with the African National Congress and its leader Nelson Mandela. Mandela was released half a year later, and the 1989 elections were the last under the limited, whites-only franchise and the Tricameral Parliament introduced in 1984. 

Of the twelve appointed and indirectly-elected seats, nine were taken by the National Party, two by the Conservative Party and one by the Democratic Party.

House of Representatives (coloured)
All five appointed and indirectly-elected seats were taken by the Labour Party.

House of Delegates (Indian)
Of the five appointed and indirectly-elected seats, three were taken by Solidarity, one by the National People’s Party and one by the Merit People's Party.

References

General elections in South Africa
Events associated with apartheid
General
South Africa
South Africa